Joseph Maynard, DCL was an Oxford college head in the 16th-century.

Glasier was educated at  Christ Church, Oxford. He was Fellow and  Rector of Exeter College, Oxford, from 1578 until his death on 9 March 1592.

References

Alumni of Christ Church, Oxford
Rectors of Exeter College, Oxford
Fellows of Exeter College, Oxford
1592 deaths
16th-century English Anglican priests